The Yaque del Sur River (Spanish, Río Yaque del Sur) is a river in the southwestern Dominican Republic. It is approximately 183 km  in length.

Etymology
Yaque or Yaqui was a Taíno word given to two rivers in the Dominican Republic. One of those rivers is called the Yaque del Norte ("Northern Yaque"), and goes to the north of Hispaniola, emptying in the Atlantic Ocean; and the second, the Yaque del Sur ("Southern Yaque") goes to the south, emptying in the Caribbean Sea.

Uses
The river is not navigable, except by small craft. It is important and used extensively for irrigating rice, plantain, sugarcane, beans, bananas, and peanuts.

References

Rivers of the Dominican Republic